Nedlukseak Island is an uninhabited island in the Qikiqtaaluk Region of Nunavut, Canada. It is located in Davis Strait, southeast of Baffin Island's Cumberland Peninsula and north of Auyuittuq National Park Reserve. Other islands in the immediate vicinity include Rock Island, Nudlung Island, Kekertaluk Island, Satigsun Island, and Pilektuak Island.

References

Islands of Baffin Island
Islands of Davis Strait
Uninhabited islands of Qikiqtaaluk Region